Hellyer is a rural locality in the local government area (LGA) of Circular Head in the North-west and west LGA region of Tasmania. The 2016 census recorded a population of 173 for the state suburb of Hellyer.

History 
Hellyer was gazetted as a locality in 1962. It was named for Henry Hellyer, a surveyor of Tasmania in the 1820s.

Geography
The waters of Bass Strait form the northern boundary, and the Detention River forms much of the eastern. A closed section of the Western Railway Line follows part of the southern boundary.

Road infrastructure 
Route A2 (Bass Highway) runs through from east to north-west.

References

Towns in Tasmania
Localities of Circular Head Council